Sebastian Mancilla Olivares; (November 6, 1956 – October 18, 2009) was a Chilean writer, director, and playwright, as well as a television, film and theatre actor. He participated in or created several films, including thirteen soap operas, and produced as well as starred in nine plays. In 1990, he went to Argentina and finally settled in Catamarca. While in Argentina, he formed the "Iron Maider" theatre troupe. He is considered an icon of Chilean art and entertainment.

Personal life 
Mancilla was born on November 6, 1959 in Santiago de Chile. He had a working class upbringing. His brother, Rafael Mancilla Olivares, is also a theatre producer.

During college, Mancille pursued theatre in the University of Chile. He would eventually form the "Potestad" theater company, which has produced several works since then. At this stage in his life, Mancilla was involved in street theatre. Once enrolled in drama school, he lived in an apartment in the Chilean capital.

In 1990, Mancilla and his family relocated to Argentina in San Fernando del Valle de Catamarca, where he worked as a theatre instructor.

In 1996, La Enfermedad Incurable premiered in Argentina under Mancilla's direction. Despite the young cast, the play became popular and was a critical success.

In 2008, Mancilla lost his mother, which plunged him into a deep depression.  In 2009, he was diagnosed with brain cancer and committed suicide later that year.

Filmography

Plays 

As an actor:

1965 — Te llamabas Catalina
1967 — La nuca de Alonso
1967 – Cosechas tu propia espina
1970 — Tierra y sangre
1971 — Vida
1972 — Aquella mañana
1973 – Un Día Común
1974 — Nunca la Vi
1974 – Siempre fuiste algo para mí

As a playwright and director:

1995 — La Enfermedad Incurable
1996 — Me Llamo Matías
1997 – El Diario de Ana Bolena
1998 — San Martín de los Andes a la miseria
1999 — La Vida de los Elfos

Sources
This article draws material from the corresponding article in the Spanish Wikipedia.

1956 births
2009 deaths
Chilean male stage actors
Chilean male film actors
Chilean male dramatists and playwrights
Chilean theatre directors
Chilean male television actors
People from Santiago
20th-century Chilean male actors
21st-century Chilean male actors
20th-century Chilean dramatists and playwrights
20th-century Chilean male writers
Suicides in Chile